The Emlenton Bridge is a steel-deck truss bridge that spans the Allegheny River just south of the town of Emlenton, Pennsylvania, United States at approximately mile marker 44.4 on I-80. This record was held until 1971 with the opening of the Fred G. Redmon Bridge near Selah, Washington.

The Emlenton Bridge remains the highest road bridge in Pennsylvania; with an overall span of  it was the largest bridge constructed as part of the Keystone Shortway project.  With the completion of the Interstate System, it is likely that the Emlenton Bridge will remain the fifth-highest bridge in the system for a significant time, behind the Glade Creek Bridge in West Virginia, the Pine Valley Creek Bridge in California, the Galena Creek Bridge in Nevada, and the aforementioned Redmon Bridge.

The bridge was designed by the consultant Buchart-Horn led by Ted Andrzejewski, an acquaintance of the noted bridge engineer Ralph Modjeski.  The contractor of record is Brodhead Construction located in Aliquippa, Pennsylvania.

The Emlenton Bridge is actually located in three different Pennsylvania counties due to its size and the geography of the land. One side of the bridge is in Venango County, the other is in Clarion County, and the southwest abutment resides in Butler County.

See also
 
 
 
 List of crossings of the Allegheny River
 List of bridges in the United States by height

References

External links

Bridges over the Allegheny River
Bridges in Clarion County, Pennsylvania
Bridges in Venango County, Pennsylvania
Road bridges in Pennsylvania
Interstate 80
Bridges on the Interstate Highway System
Steel bridges in the United States
1968 establishments in Pennsylvania
Bridges completed in 1968